Longwood (c. 1785) is a plantation located at 15417 River Road in East Baton Rouge Parish, Louisiana, which was listed on National Register of Historic Places in 1983. Directly across the street is a levee holding back the Mississippi River.

Style
The house is two storied and built in the Greek Revival Style with four Doric columns supporting the two front porches.  It was built in a non-traditional "T" floor pattern.  A rear addition was added in the late 19th century, and the kitchen brought up after that.  The indoor corridors, however, are a cruciform pattern. Except for the kitchen, the house was built all together in its entirety.

There are four chimneys that feed into 7 rooms  They are on two floors at either end of the house and two in the middle.

Historic significance
Longwood is one of four remaining plantation homes in the Baton Rouge area still in good condition. Many of Baton Rouge's antebellum homes have been lost due to urbanization and to decay but Longwood remains one of four still left in its style.  However, it is unique in that it is one of the few plantation homes in the region that did not add an additional "L" wing when modernizing.  The result is the cruciform style mentioned previously.

History
Longwood, a former sugar cane plantation, used to occupy all the land from the Mississippi River to Highland Road.  The original tract was a land grant from the King of Spain.

Changes
Since construction of the house several changes have been made.  An outbuilding was moved to the house and converted into a kitchen.  Several wooden paneled doors were replaced with glass ones.  Bathroom and closets were added to several rooms with windows for the bathrooms.

The changes can be considered minor since they did not affect the house's architecture.

A shed and barn are located on the property and are thought to have been built in 1928.

The  property, with three contributing buildings, was listed on National Register of Historic Places on July 7, 1983.

See also
National Register of Historic Places listings in East Baton Rouge Parish, Louisiana

References

External links
Longmont summary webpage at Louisiana state

Houses on the National Register of Historic Places in Louisiana
Houses completed in 1785
Houses in Baton Rouge, Louisiana
National Register of Historic Places in Baton Rouge, Louisiana